The 2019 Digital Ally 250 was a NASCAR Gander Outdoors Truck Series race held on May 10, 2019, at Kansas Speedway in Kansas City, Kansas. Contested over 167 laps on the 1.5 mile (2.4 km) asphalt speedway, it was the seventh race of the 2019 NASCAR Gander Outdoors Truck Series season.

Background

Track

Kansas Speedway is a  tri-oval race track in Kansas City, Kansas. It was built in 2001 and it currently hosts two annual NASCAR race weekends. The IndyCar Series also held races at the venue until 2011. The speedway is owned and operated by the International Speedway Corporation.

Entry list

Practice

First practice

Final practice

Qualifying

Qualifying results

After qualifying the cars, Jennifer Jo Cobb and Joey Gase swapped rides.

Race

Summary

Stage Results

Stage One
Laps: 40

Stage Two
Laps: 40

Final Stage Results

Stage Three
Laps: 87

References

2019 in sports in Kansas
Digital Ally 250
NASCAR races at Kansas Speedway